The Quads were a new wave band from Birmingham, England, active in the late 1970s and early 1980s. Their 1979 single "There Must Be Thousands" was a favourite of the BBC Radio 1 DJ John Peel, who selected it as his "single of the decade!"

Despite receiving considerable airplay on the main BBC Radio 1 daytime programmes, "There Must Be Thousands" only reached No. 66 in the UK singles chart, but in 2001 John Peel still listed it as one of his all-time favourite records.

Then, in 2013, to coincide with its use on a promotional video by natural skincare company JooMo, the track was re-released by Big Bear Records .

Discography

Singles
"There Must Be Thousands" / "You’ve Gotta Jive", 1979, UK No. 66 
"There's Never Been A Night" / "Take It", 1979
"UFO" / "Astronaut's Journey", 1980
"Gotta Get A Job" / "Gang Of Kids", 1981
"Still Moment (In Time)" / "Time To Think", 1982

Compilations
Bouncing In The Red, 1980 EMI album, includes:
"There Must Be Thousands"
Brum Beat - Live At The Barrel Organ, 1980 Big Bear Records double album, includes:
"When Everything's Said And Done"
"Wonders Never Cease"
Shake Some Action Volume 1, 2001 bootleg CD album, includes:
"There Must Be Thousands" (re-mastered from vinyl)

Peel session
On 29 August 1979, The Quads recorded a Peel session incorporating;
"Revision Time Blues"
"I Know You Know"
"There's Never Been A Night"
"There Must Be Thousands"

Members
 Josh Jones – vocals, guitar
 Jack Jones – guitar
 Johnny Jones – drums
 Jim Doherty – bass guitar

Music excerpts

 Listen on YouTube There must be thousands - Bouncing in the red,  1980 EMI
 Listen on YouTube Feel the need for more - Unreleased material,  1988

References

External links
 The punkmodpop archives
 The Quads Official Website

English new wave musical groups